Huia is a western coastal settlement in West Auckland, New Zealand and forms part of the Waitākere Ranges Regional Park. The majority of houses in Huia are located along Huia Road, which arcs around Huia Bay and heads west towards Little Huia.

Geology and geography

Between 3 and 5 million years ago, tectonic forces between the Pacific Plate and Australian Plate uplifted the Waitākere Ranges and subsided the Manukau Harbour. The Huia creek and valley is likely a part of a fault-line that formed during this event. After the Last Glacial Maximum when sea levels rose, the river mouths of West Auckland flooded. While beaches formed at the mouths of Tasman Sea rivers, the relative lack of sand in the Manukau Harbour meant that Huia, Big Muddy Creek and Little Muddy Creek became tidal mudflats. The Huia area is dominated by a warm lowlands pūriri forest, with a band of diverse pōhutukawa/rata sheltered coastal fringe forest on the western shores of Huia Bay.

History

Huia was originally known as Te Huia as the area is thought to be named after a Waikato Tainui chief, Te Huia, who would seasonally live on the northern shores of the Manukau Harbour. Over time, Te Huia decided to remain at the bay, as he liked it so much. A long form of the traditional name is Te Rau-o-te-Huia ("The Plumes of Te Huia", the plumes also being a metaphor for his pride in the location). The English translation "The Huia" was used into the 1970s, but simply "Huia" has now become more commonplace. Carbon dating of shell middens at Hinge Bay, Huia, showed occupancy of Huia by Tāmaki Māori from at least the year 1520.

In 1853 the Gibbons family from Newfoundland arrived at Huia, setting up a mill for kauri logging. The Karamatura Stream to the west of Huia was one of the first streams in the Waitākere Ranges to be dammed for kauri logging, followed by the Marama and Kakamatua streams in the 1860s and the Huia Stream in the 1870s. The Gibbons family were joined by William and Mary Kilgour, who established a farm in the flatlands at Huia, and the Foote family, relatives of the Gibbons also from Newfoundland.

Construction on the Upper Huia Dam began in 1924, leading to wider development in the area as houses were constructed for workers' families. Material for the dam was brought by barge to Huia, and then by tramway to the dam site. The dam was completed in 1929, leading to an exodus of families who worked on the dam leaving the area. The tramway remained operational until the 1960s. After the construction of the dam, the area became popular with holidaymakers and retirees. As the Huia valley began to reforest, this fueled a movement to develop the ranges as a regional park. The Centennial Memorial Park, a portion of which would later become the modern Waitākere Ranges, opened in 1940.

In the mid-1950s, a whale stranded at Huia. An attempt was made to explode the whale using gelignite, however this was mostly unsuccessful.

By the 1960s, a community of artists and poets had developed at Huia. In 1971, the Lower Huia Dam was constructed adjacent to the township.

Demographics
It is part of the Waitākere Ranges South SA2 statistical area.

Huia had a population of 639 at the 2018 New Zealand census, an increase of 51 people (8.7%) since the 2013 census, and an increase of 93 people (17.0%) since the 2006 census. There were 264 households. There were 315 males and 324 females, giving a sex ratio of 0.97 males per female, with 123 people (19.2%) aged under 15 years, 93 (14.6%) aged 15 to 29, 360 (56.3%) aged 30 to 64, and 69 (10.8%) aged 65 or older.

Ethnicities were 94.4% European/Pākehā, 19.7% Māori, 4.7% Pacific peoples, 3.3% Asian, and 0.9% other ethnicities. People may identify with more than one ethnicity.

Although some people chose not to answer the census's question about religious affiliation, 70.4% had no religion, 19.2% were Christian, 0.5% had Māori religious beliefs, 0.9% were Buddhist and 2.3% had other religions.

Of those at least 15 years old, 141 (27.3%) people had a bachelor or higher degree, and 63 (12.2%) people had no formal qualifications. The employment status of those at least 15 was that 297 (57.6%) people were employed full-time, 78 (15.1%) were part-time, and 12 (2.3%) were unemployed.

Features

The Huia Store, the sole local general store and cafe, opened in 1886. Huia is also served by the Huia Volunteer Fire Brigade.

On the shores of Huia Bay is Huia Reserve, there are picnic tables, a BBQ, a small playground, basketball half-court and a half pipe for skating. It is close to the Lower Huia Dam, Upper Huia Dam and Karamatura Falls.

The Upper Huia Dam opened in 1929 and the Lower Huia Dam opened in 1971. Both reservoirs form part of the water supply for Auckland and are managed by Watercare Services.

The Auckland Council operates several accommodation facilities in the area including the Kiwanis Huia camp, Huia Lodge, Barr cottage (situated on the waterfront in Little Huia) and a camping area known as Barn Paddock in the Karamatura farm. Huia Lodge was the school house of Huia School between 1894 and 1961; the local state secondary school is Green Bay High School.

Huia Settlers Museum, opened in 1984, is located near the entrance to the Karamatura Park. It contains many relics of the Kauri felling and milling and artefacts from the wreck of HMS Orpheus. 

Jonesonian Institute, a small eclectic museum and art gallery modelled on Museum of Jurassic Technology, is also located in Huia.

There are an abundance of walking tracks around the Huia area and there are numerous camp sites in the Karamatura Valley. The highest point in the Waitākere Ranges - Te Toiokawharu (474m), accessible via the Twin Peaks Track, is part of this valley.

Notes

References

External links
Photographs of Huia held in Auckland Libraries' heritage collections.

Waitākere Ranges
Populated places around the Manukau Harbour
Waitākere Ranges Local Board Area
West Auckland, New Zealand